Jaén may refer to:

Places

Peru
Jaén Province, Peru, a province in Cajamarca Region, Peru
Jaén District, one of twelve districts of the province Jaén in Peru
Jaén, Peru, a city in Peru, capital of the Jaén Province

Philippines
Jaen, Nueva Ecija, a municipality in the Philippines

Spain
Kingdom of Jaén, a territorial jurisdiction of the Crown of Castile from 1246 to 1833
Province of Jaén (Spain), a province in southern Spain
Jaén (Congress of Deputies constituency), the electoral district used for the Spanish Congress of Deputies, corresponding to the province of Jaén
Jaén, Spain, a city in south-central Spain, capital of the province of Jaén
Roman Catholic Diocese of Jaén, a diocese located in the city of Jaén in the ecclesiastical province of Granada
Taifa of Jaén, a medieval kingdom in 1145 and 1168

People
Jaen (name), a male name in South Africa and Estonia
Jaén (surname), a Spanish surname
Andrés González Jaén (born 1993), Spanish footballer
Jaime Jaen (born 1978), Panamanian baseball player
Miguel Ángel López Jaén (born 1982), Spanish tennis player

Grapes
 Jaén or Jaenes, most commonly, Cayetana blanca
 Jaén blanco, variety of Cayetana
 Jaén rosado, variety of Cayetana
 Jaén colorado, variety of Mencía, from León, Spain
 Jaen do Dão, variety of Mencía, from Portugal
 Jaén tinto (grape), from Huelva, Spain

Other uses
Jaén FS, a futsal club based in Jaén, Spain
Real Jaén, a football club based in the city of Jaén, Spain

See also
 Jaén Province (disambiguation)
 Siege of Jaén (disambiguation)